Andrei Sergeyevich Mironov (born 4 January 1997) is a Russian football player. He plays as a defensive midfielder.

Club career
He made his professional debut in the Russian Professional Football League for FC Rubin-2 Kazan on 18 July 2014 in a game against FC Syzran-2003 Syzran.

He played his first game for the main squad of FC Rubin Kazan on 24 September 2015 in a Russian Cup game against FC SKA-Energiya Khabarovsk which his team lost 0–2.

References

1997 births
Association football midfielders
Footballers from Kazan
Living people
Russian footballers
Russian expatriate footballers
Russia youth international footballers
FC Rubin Kazan players
FC Torpedo Moscow players
FC Orenburg players
BFC Daugavpils players
Latvian Higher League players
Russian expatriate sportspeople in Latvia
Expatriate footballers in Latvia